Jordan Steven Dermott Buckingham is an Australian cricketer. He made his first-class debut for South Australia against New South Wales on 23 March 2022 during the 2021–22 Sheffield Shield season. In December 2022, Buckingham was selected to play for Cricket Australia XI against South Africa as part of the 2022 South African tour of Australia.

References

Living people
Australian cricketers
South Australia cricketers
Cricketers from Melbourne
2000 births
People from Bundoora, Victoria
Sportsmen from Victoria (Australia)